Keegan Linderboom (born 26 September 1989) is a South African-born New Zealand professional footballer who plays as a forward. To date, Keegan has played in 5 countries including Singapore and Thailand

Club career 
Linderboom had an instant impact in his Birkenhead United career, scoring seven goals in the first five rounds of the competition.

After finishing as top goal scorer at the 2014 Pacific Cup, Linderboom signed for Ba FC for the 2015 OFC Champions League. He helped guide Ba to the Semi Finals.

Linderboom scored 15 goals in 31 games for Waitakere United over two years before joining Singapore Premier League side Balestier Khalsa ahead of the 2018 Singapore Premier League, rejecting offers from Auckland City FC and South African top-tier side Bloemfontein Celtic. Linderboom scored his first goal for the Tigers on his debut. He followed that up by scoring 4 goals in his first 6 appearances for Balestier before getting injured. On his first game back from injury he scored the winner against Young Lions securing Balestiers first win in 7 games since his injury.

After a brief stint overseas in Melbourne Australia, Linderboom signed back in his home country for Auckland City In August 2019.

He did not spend long back in New Zealand before signing for Thailand club Bangkok FC in January 2020. Linderboom scored 2 goals from 3 games before COVID-19 ended the season. He rejoined Bangkok FC for the next season and helped the club achieve the playoffs.

Linderboom returned to New Zealand after the Thai season ended in April 2021 and signed for Manukau United in the Auckland premier league.

References

External links
 

1989 births
Living people
Association football forwards
South African soccer players
Waitakere United players
Birkenhead United AFC players
Ba F.C. players
Eastern Suburbs AFC players
Balestier Khalsa FC players
Keegan Linderboom
Singapore Premier League players
South African expatriate soccer players
Expatriate footballers in Singapore
Expatriate association footballers in New Zealand
Expatriate footballers in Fiji
New Zealand people of South African descent
New Zealand expatriate association footballers
New Zealand association footballers